Zechariah 3 is the third of the total 14 chapters in the Book of Zechariah in the Hebrew Bible or the Old Testament of the Christian Bible. This book contains the prophecies attributed to the prophet Zechariah, and is a part of the Book of the Twelve Minor Prophets. The chapter contains the vision of Joshua, the high priest, being cleansed before God. It is a part of a section (so-called "First Zechariah") consisting of Zechariah 1–8.

Text
The original text was written in the Hebrew language. This chapter is divided into 10 verses.

Textual witnesses
Some early manuscripts containing the text of this chapter in Hebrew are of the Masoretic Text, which includes the Codex Cairensis (from year 895), the Petersburg Codex of the Prophets (916), and Codex Leningradensis (1008).

Fragments containing parts of this chapter were found among the Dead Sea Scrolls, that is, 4Q80 (4QXIIe; 75–50 BCE) with extant verses 2–10.

There is also a translation into Koine Greek known as the Septuagint, made in the last few centuries BCE. Extant ancient manuscripts of the Septuagint version include Codex Vaticanus (B; B; 4th century), Codex Sinaiticus (S; BHK: S; 4th century), Codex Alexandrinus (A; A; 5th century) and Codex Marchalianus (Q; Q; 6th century). Some fragments containing parts of this chapter (a revision of the Septuagint) were found among the Dead Sea Scrolls, that is, Naḥal Ḥever 8Ḥev1 (8ḤevXIIgr); late 1st century BCE) with extant verses 1–7.

Commentary
Zechariah's fourth of the eight visions in chapters 1–8 shows the high priest Joshua ("Jeshua" in Ezra–Nehemiah)
accused by "the Satan" ("the Adversary", acting as the
prosecuting counsel in the heavenly court) but acquitted. His subsequent "cleansing" gives the sign that God will forgive and cleanse the community, signified by the renewal of the temple services.

Vision of the High Priest (3:1–5)
In the fourth of the eight visions, the prophets sees a real person, the high priest Joshua, instead of symbolic objects like in other visions. The replacement of Joshua's "filthy clothes" (verses 3–4) with new apparel gives the legitimation of the new temple and priesthood.

The Coming Branch (3:6–10)
The resumption of the temple worship will lead to the coming of "the Branch" (verse 8), who will restore the kingship into a new era (verse 10), when the iniquity of the land will be cleansed in one day (verse 9).

Verse 8
 Hear now, O Joshua the high priest,
 thou, and thy fellows that sit before thee:
 for they are men wondered at:
 for, behold, I will bring forth my servant the Branch.
"Men wondered at": Septuagint: ,  "men observers of wonders;" Vulgate: Quia viri portendentes sunt (cf. ); can be rendered, "men of portent, sign, or type," that the Revised Version has, "men which are a sign," those who foreshadow some future events, for good things to come; NKJV: "they are a wondrous sign", lit. "men of a sign or wonder".
"My servants the Branch": The double significance to the messianic meaning of the passage is emphasized by the collocation of the two keywords "servant" and "branch" (cf. ; 42:1, ; 43:10; 44:1, 2, ; ; Jeremiah 23:5; 33:15).
 "The Branch" (Hebrew: tsemakh): generally seen as a reference to Messiah, coming from the almost extinct royal line of David (Zechariah 6:12; Isaiah 4:2; Isaiah 11:1; Jeremiah 23:5; Jeremiah 33:15). Jeremiah 23:5;), and by the Vulgate as orientem (similarly in the Syriac and Arabic; cf. ). Aben Ezra noted that "many interpreters say this Branch is the Messiah: and he is called Zerubbabel, because he is of his seed, even as he is called David; and David my servant shall be their Prince for ever" (cf. ).

See also

Related Bible parts: Isaiah 4, Isaiah 11, Jeremiah 23, Jeremiah 33, Haggai 1, Zechariah 1, Zechariah 2, Zechariah 4, Zechariah 5, Zechariah 6, Luke 1, Revelation 5

Notes

References

Sources

External links

Jewish
Zechariah 3 Hebrew with Parallel English
Zechariah 3 Hebrew with Rashi's Commentary

Christian
Zechariah 3 English Translation with Parallel Latin Vulgate 

03
Satan